The English novelist, journalist and playwright Arnold Bennett wrote prolifically between 1898 and his death in 1931. This is a list of his published books and adaptations of his works for stage and screen.

Fiction

Novels 

Sources: New Cambridge Bibliography of English Literature and Arnold Bennett by Margaret Drabble.

Short stories

The Loot of Cities: Being the Adventures of a Millionaire in Search of Joy 1905
The Loot of Cities; Mr Penfound's two Burglars; Midnight at the Grand Babylon; The Police Station; The Adventure of the Prima Donna; The Episode in Room 222; Saturday to Monday; A Dinner at the Louvre
Tales of the Five Towns 1905
At Home; His Worship the Goose Driver; The Elixir of Youth; Mary with the High Hand; The Dog; A Feud; Phantom; Tiddy-Fol-Lol; The Idiot; Abroad; Hungarian Rhapsody; The Sisters Quita; Nocturne at the Majestic; Clarice of the Autumn Concerts; A Letter Home (written in 1893)
The Grim Smile of the Five Towns 1907
The Lion's Share; The Baby's Bath; The Silent Brothers; The Nineteenth Hat; Vera's First Christmas Adventure; The Murder of the Mandarin; Vera’s Second Christmas Adventure; The Burglary; The News of the Engagement; Beginning the New Year; From one Generation to Another; The Death of Simon Fuge; In a New Bottle
The Matador of the Five Towns 1912
Tragedy: The Matador of the Five Towns; Mimi; The Supreme Illusion; The Letter and the Lie; The Glimpse; Frolic: Jock-at-a-Venture; The Heroism of Thomas Chadwick; Under the Clock; Three episodes of the life of Mr Cowlishaw, dentist; Catching the Train; The Widow at the Balcony; The Cat and Cupid; The Fortune Teller; The Long-lost Uncle; The Tight Hand; Why the Clock Stopped; Hot Potatoes; Half a Sovereign; The Blue Suit; The Tiger and the Baby; The Revolver; An Unfair Advantage

Elsie and the Child, and other stories 1924
Elsie and the Child; During Dinner; The Paper Cap; The Box-Office Girl; Mr Jack Hollins against Fate; Nine o'clock To-morrow; The Yacht; Outside and Inside; Last Love; The Mysterious Destruction of Mr Ipple; The Perfect Creature; The Fish; The Limits of Dominion
The Woman who Stole Everything, and other stories 1927
The Woman who Stole Everything; A Place in Venice; The Toreador; Middle-aged; The Umbrella; House to Let; Claribel; Time to think; One of their Quarrels
The Night Visitor and other stories 1931
The Night Visitor; The Cornet-Player; Murder; The Hat; Under the Hammer; The Wind; Honour; The First Night; The Seven Policemen; Myrtle at 6 a.m.; Strange Affair at an Hotel; The Second Night; The Understudy; The Peacock; Dream; Baccarat; The Mouse and the Cat
"Uncollected Short Stories 1892-1932" (pub 2010)
He Needn’t Have Troubled How He Looked; The Artist’s Model; In a Hospital. A Broken-Off Match; The Heavenly Twins on the Revolt of the Daughters; A Modern Girl. The Revolt of me Daughter; The Silken Serpent. A Fantasia; A First Night. ‘The Floodgates of Society’; Strange Story. In the Matter of a Letter and a Lady; Five O’Clock at the Heroines’ Club. A Fantasy; Rejected. A Girl and Another Girl; An Academy Work. The Mutilation of a Statue; Fenella: A Manx Idyll; ‘My First Book’; The Repentance of Ronald Primula; A Divided Ghost; The Clapham Theosophical Society; An Astral Engagement; The Fatal Marriage; Dr Anna Jekyll and Miss Hyde; The Phantasm of My Grandmother; The Crystal-Gazers; A Little Deal in ‘Kaffirs’; The Adamless Eden. A new Fairytale; John and the Lovely Stranger; The Marriage of Jane Hendra; The Christmas Chimes of Malyprès; Dragons of the Night; The Great Fire at Santa Claus’ House; The Romance of Bobby Lempriere; The Scratched Face; A Millionaire’s Wife; The Phantom Sneeze; The Strange Shelter; The Railway Station; The Farlls and a Woman; The White Feather; The Life of Nash Nicklin; The Muscovy Ducks; The Great Huntress; Leading to Marriage; The Flight
Lord Dover & Other Lost Stories (pub 2011)
Lord Dover; What’s Bred in the Bone; The Advanced Woman; Restaurant Spooks; The Renaissance of the Romp; Little Popow; Varnish and Vanity at the RA; On Growing Old; The Train; How Percy Goes to the Office; The Inner-Circle Express; Stella’s Journey; The Clock; The Fortress; The Power of Love; Miss Scrooge; The Lure of Life; The Alarm; What Men Want

Stage and screen

Polite Farces for the Drawing Room (contains The Stepmother, A Good Woman and A Question of Sex) 1899
 Cupid and Commonsense (dramatisation of The Old Wives' Tale) 1908
 What the Public Wants 1909
 The Honeymoon 1911
 Milestones (with Edward Knoblock) 1912
 The Great Adventure 1913
 The Title 1918
 "The Wedding Dress" (film scenario) 1920
Sacred and Profane Love (based on the 1903 novel) 1919
 Judith 1922
 The Love Match 1922

 Body and Soul 1922
Don Juan de Maraña 1923
 London Life (with Knoblock) 1924
 The Bright Island 1924
The Only Way film scenario 1926
Mr Prohack 1927 (with Knoblock, based on the 1922 novel)
 The Return Journey 1928
"Punch and Judy" (film scenario) 1928
 Piccadilly film screenplay 1929
Judith libretto for one-act opera, based on his 1922 play; music by Eugene Goossens 1929
Don Juan de Maraña libretto for four-act opera, based on his 1923 play, music by Goossens. Libretto completed in 1931; opera premiered (Covent Garden) 1937

Non-fiction

Journalism for Women 1898
Fame and Fiction (collected criticism) 1901
The Truth about an Author (autobiographical) 1903
How to Become an     Author: A Practical Guide 1903
The Reasonable Life 1907
The Human Machine: A Pocket Philosophy 1909
Literary Taste: How to Form It 1909
How to Live on 24 Hours a Day 1910
The Feast of St Friend: A Christmas Book 1911 (published in the US and in later British editions as Friendship and Happiness)
Mental Efficiency, and Other Hints to Men and Women 1911
Those United States 1912 (published in the US as Your United States)
The Plain Man and His Wife 1913
Paris Nights and Other Impressions of Places and People 1913
The Author's Craft 1914

From the Log of the Velsa (travel sketches, published in the US in 1914 and in Britain in 1920)
Liberty: A Statement of the British Case 1914
Over There: War Scenes on the Western Front 1915
Books and Persons: Selections from The New Age 1908–1911) 1917
Self and Self-Management 1918
Our Women: Chapters on Sex-Discord 1920
The Art of A. E. Rickards 1920
Things That Have Interested Me 1921
Things That Have Interested Me (second series) 1923
How to Make the Best of Life 1923
How to Live  1925; consisting of How to Live on 24 Hours a Day, Mental Efficiency, and Self and Self-Management
Things That Have Interested Me (third series) 1926
The Savour of Life: Essays in Gusto 1928
The Religious Interregnum 1929

Journals
Volumes 1 and 2 (1896–1921), edited by Newman Flower, 1932
Volume (1921–1928), edited by Flower, 1933
Journal for 1929, edited by Bennett, 1930
Selections from the complete journals, edited and selected by Frank Swinnerton, 1954 (revised edition, with additions, 1971) 
Florentine Journal, 1910 with illustrations by Bennett, 1967

Letters
The Letters of Arnold Bennett edited by James Hepburn, four volumes, 1966–1986

Sources: Arnold Bennett by Frank Swinnerton; Arnold Bennett by Margaret Drabble.

Adaptations by others

Cinema
The Grand Babylon Hotel (1916)
Milestones (1916)
Milestones (1920)
The Great Adventure (1921)
The Old Wives' Tale (1921)
The Card (1922)
His Double Life (1933)
Holy Matrimony (1943)
Dear Mr. Prohack (1949)
The Card (1952)

Television
The Great Adventure: BBC 1939, with D. A. Clarke-Smith, Marda Vanne and Felix Aylmer
The Great Adventure: BBC 1947, with Harold Scott, Iris Baker and Richard Goolden
The Title: BBC 1950, with Jill Esmond and Raymond Huntley
Milestones: BBC 1950, with Michael Denison and Dulcie Gray
The Great Adventure: BBC 1958, with Margaret Lockwood and Alec Clunes
Hilda Lessways: BBC 1959 – six-part dramatisation of Clayhanger and Hilda Lessways, with Judi Dench
What the Public Wants: BBC 1959, with Patrick Wymark, Dulcie Gray and Hugh Burden
The Old Wives' Tale: BBC 1964 – five-part dramatisation, with Frances Cuka and Lana Morris
Lord Raingo: BBC 1966 – four-part dramatisation, with Kenneth More
Imperial Palace: BBC 1969 – four-part dramatisation, with Roy Dotrice and Cyril Luckham
Whom God Hath Joined: BBC 1970, with Brian Blessed
The Price of Love: BBC 1970, with Stephan Chase
Clayhanger ATV 1976 – 26-part adaptation of Clayhanger, Hilda Lessways and These Twain, with Peter McEnery, Denis Quilley, Janet Suzman and Harry Andrews
Anna of the Five Towns: BBC 1985 – four-part dramatisation, with Lynsey Beauchamp, Emrys James, Peter Davison, Anton Lesser and Anna Cropper
Sophia and Constance: BBC 1988 – six-part dramatisation of The Old Wives' Tale, with Lynsey Beauchamp, Katy Behean and Patricia Routledge 
Sources: BBC Genome and British Film Institute.

References

Sources

 
 
 

 
Bibliographies by writer
Bibliographies of English writers
Journalism bibliographies